The Sound of a Dirt Road is a 2008 Christian film directed by Graham D. Alexander. In less than a year, Alexander wrote, directed and filmed the movie East Texas, for less than $900. The Sound of a Dirt Road was featured at the San Antonio Independent Christian Film Festival. It was chosen as one of eight finalists in the feature film category, out of 50 submissions.

Plot 
John Crowe (Ross Renfroe) is a rancher whose family has owned and managed the Crowe Ranch for over 150 years. John meets Ellen Sower, and his life slowly begins to change. Jeremiah Stillwell, the soon-to-be pastor of the local church, also becomes interested in Ellen. Intellectual warfare ensues as John rescues Ellen, then learns she is deathly ill. Jeremiah desires power, and once he gets it, he goes after John.

References

External links 
 Official website
 The Sound of a Dirt Road at the San Antonio Independent Christian Film Festival
 The Sound of a Dirt Road: Film Review at Christian-Movie.com

Films about evangelicalism
2008 films
2008 drama films
2000s English-language films